The Great South Bay is a lagoon situated between Long Island and Fire Island, in the State of New York. It is protected from the Atlantic Ocean by Fire Island, a barrier island, as well as the eastern end of Jones Beach Island and Captree Island.

Robert Moses Causeway adjoins the Great South Bay Bridge, which leads to Robert Moses State Park.

The bay is accessible from the ocean through Fire Island Inlet, which lies between the western tip of Fire Island and the eastern tip of Jones Beach Island. The bay adjoins South Oyster Bay on its western end, and Patchogue and Moriches bays at the east end.

History
In the early 17th century, European settlers first encountered the native Montaukett Indian Nation. Among the earliest British families were the Smith, Carman and Hewlett families. 
Long Island's South Shore, which includes Lindenhurst, Babylon, Islip, Oakdale, Sayville, Bayport, Blue Point, Patchogue, Bellport, Shirley, and Mastic Beach.

Environmental concerns

In the late nineteenth century Great South Bay provided many of the clams consumed throughout the region and even the country. The first oysters to be exported from the US to Europe came from Great South Bay. By the latter 20th century, a significant percentage of the habitat was lost. Hurricane Sandy, the largest storm to affect the region since 1938, made landfall with devastating impact to Fire Island sea shores, including multiple breaches, the largest of which formed just south of Bellport. This was formerly known as Old Inlet. Residents were concerned it would have effects on tidal increases and potential flooding, when in actuality it has allowed the bay to relieve some of its captive water, which has changed the salinity and nitrogen levels in the bay. After roughly 75 years, the bay begun flushing itself out which may improve the water condition within the bay. Regulations set forth by the US Government National Wildlife Preserve, which has a seven-mile stretch of land (The Otis Pike Fire Island High Dune Wilderness) prohibit any unauthorized parties from performing any kind of man made changes, thus the inlet has remained open. There have been a number of ongoing public meeting discussing the future of the Inlet. All the other breaches were closed by the Army Corps of Engineers. In 2012, The Save the Great South Bay (STGSB)  not-for-profit organization was formed in order to work towards better conservation of the water and its beachfronts. Save The Great South Bay has increased concerns about boat sewerage pumpouts in The Great South Bay as a serious ecological concern.

See also
South Shore Estuary

References

External links

United By Water - It is no coincidence that The Great South Bay and the New York–New Jersey Harbor estuaries are home to one of the most vibrant and economically important metropolitan areas in the country and the world.
Back To Baysics - Great South Bay environmental awareness campaign
Great South Bay Project
Peconic Baykeepers The Waterkeeper Alliance Member for the Great South Bay
NOAA chart 12352

Babylon (town), New York
Lagoons of New York (state)
Brookhaven, New York
Bays of Suffolk County, New York
Islip (town), New York
Southampton (town), New York
Oyster Bay (town), New York